The three wise monkeys are a Japanese pictorial maxim, embodying the proverbial principle "see no evil, hear no evil, speak no evil". The three monkeys are
 Mizaru, who sees no evil, covering his eyes
 Kikazaru, who hears no evil, covering his ears, and
 Iwazaru, who speaks no evil, covering his mouth.

Lafcadio Hearn refers to them as the three mystic apes.

There are various meanings ascribed to the monkeys and the proverb including associations with being of good mind, speech and action. The phrase is often used to refer to those who deal with impropriety by turning a blind eye.

Outside Japan the monkeys' names are sometimes given as Mizaru, Mikazaru and Mazaru, as the last two names were corrupted from the Japanese originals. The monkeys are Japanese macaques, a common species in Japan.

Origin

The source that popularized this pictorial maxim is a 17th-century carving over a door of the Tōshō-gū shrine in Nikkō, Japan. The carvings at Tōshō-gū Shrine were carved by Hidari Jingoro, and believed to have incorporated Confucius’s Code of Conduct, using the monkey as a way to depict man’s life cycle. There are a total of eight panels, and the iconic three wise monkeys picture comes from panel 2. The philosophy, however, probably originally came to Japan with a Tendai-Buddhist legend, from China in the 8th century (Nara Period). It has been suggested that the figures represent the three dogmas of the so-called middle school of the sect.

In Chinese, two similar phrases exist: one is in the late Analects of Confucius (from 4th to 2nd century BCE), that reads: "Look not at what is contrary to propriety; listen not to what is contrary to propriety; speak not what is contrary to propriety; make no movement which is contrary to propriety"; the other is in the book Xunzi (from the 3rd century BCE), which reads: "[The gentleman] makes his eyes not want to see what is not right, makes his ears not want to hear what is not right, makes his mouth not want to speak what is not right, and makes his heart not want to deliberate over what is not right". Those may be the inspiration for the pictorial maxim after Chinese works were brought into Japan.

It is through the Kōshin rite of folk religion that the most significant examples are presented. The Kōshin belief or practice is a Japanese folk religion with Chinese Taoism origins and ancient Shinto influence. It was founded by Tendai Buddhist monks in the late 10th century. A considerable number of stone monuments can be found all over the eastern part of Japan around Tokyo. During the later part of the Muromachi period, it was customary to display stone pillars depicting the three monkeys during the observance of Kōshin.

Though the teaching had nothing to do with monkeys, the concept of the three monkeys originated from a simple play on words. Thus the saying (which does not include any specific reference to "evil") can also be interpreted as referring to three monkeys.

The shrine at Nikko is a Shinto shrine, and the monkey is an extremely important being in the Shinto religion. The monkey is believed to be the messenger of the Hie Shinto shrines, which also have connections with Tendai Buddhism. There are even important festivals that are celebrated during the year of the Monkey (occurring every twelve years) and a special festival is celebrated every sixteenth year of the Kōshin.

"The Three Mystic Apes" (Sambiki Saru) were described as "the attendants of Saruta Hito no Mikoto or Kōshin, the God of the Roads". The Kōshin festival was held on the 60th day of the calendar. It has been suggested that during the Kōshin festival, according to old beliefs, one's bad deeds might be reported to heaven "unless avoidance actions were taken…". It has been theorized that the three Mystic Apes, Not Seeing, Hearing, or Speaking, may have been the "things that one has done wrong in the last 59 days".

According to other accounts, the monkeys caused the Sanshi and Ten-Tei not to see, say or hear the bad deeds of a person. The  are the Three Corpses living in everyone's body. The Sanshi keep track of the good deeds and particularly the bad deeds of the person they inhabit. Ten-Tei will then decide to punish bad people, making them ill, shortening their time alive, and in extreme cases putting an end to their lives. Those believers of Kōshin who have reason to fear will try to stay awake during Kōshin nights. This is the only way to prevent the Sanshi from leaving their body and reporting to Ten-Tei.

Meaning of the proverb

Just as there is disagreement about the origin of the phrase, there are differing explanations of the meaning of "see no evil, hear no evil, speak no evil".
 In Buddhist tradition, the tenets of the proverb are about not dwelling on evil thoughts.
 The proverb and the image are often used to refer to a lack of moral responsibility on the part of people who refuse to acknowledge impropriety, looking the other way or feigning ignorance.

Variations
Sometimes there is a fourth monkey depicted, Sezaru, who symbolizes the principle of "do no evil", which fits with the full quote from Analects of Confucius. The monkey may be shown crossing its arms or covering its genitals. Yet another variation has the fourth monkey hold its nose to avoid a stench and has been dubbed "smell no evil" accordingly.

The opposite version of the three wise monkeys can also be found. In this case, one monkey holds its hands to its eyes to focus vision, the second monkey cups its hands around its ears to improve hearing, and the third monkey holds its hands to its mouth like a bullhorn. Another modern interpretation is "Hear, see, and speak out loud for what you stand for".

Rajneesh movement
According to Osho Rajneesh, the monkey symbolism originated in ancient Hindu tradition and Buddhist monks spread this symbolism across Asia. The original Hindu and Buddhist version has four monkeys and the fourth monkey covers its genitals. The Buddhist version means this as "Don't do anything evil".

In Hindu original version the meaning of the fourth monkey is very different from the popular Buddhist version. It means, "Hide your pleasures. Hide your enjoyment, don't show it to anybody."

Osho Rajneesh gave his own meaning regarding this. The first monkey denotes 'Don't listen to the truth because it will disturb all your consoling lies'. The second monkey denotes 'Don't look at the truth; otherwise your God will be dead and your heaven and hell will disappear'. The third monkey denotes 'Don't speak the truth, otherwise you will be condemned, crucified, poisoned, tortured by the whole crowd, the unconscious people. The fourth monkey denotes "Keep your pleasures, your joys, hidden. Don't let anybody know that you are a cheerful man, a blissful man, an ecstatic man, because that will destroy your very life. It is dangerous".

Cultural influences

The three wise monkeys, and the associated proverb, are known throughout Asia and outside Asia. They have been a motif in pictures, such as the ukiyo-e (Japanese woodblock printings) by Keisai Eisen, and are frequently represented in modern culture.

Mahatma Gandhi's main exception to his lifestyle of non-possession was a small statue of the three monkeys - Bapu, Ketan and Bandar. Today, a larger representation of the three monkeys is prominently displayed at the Sabarmati Ashram in Ahmedabad, Gujarat, where Gandhi lived from 1915 to 1930 and from where he departed on his famous salt march. Gandhi's statue also inspired a 2008 artwork by Subodh Gupta, Gandhi's Three Monkeys.

The three monkeys are depicted in the trial scene in the 1968 film Planet of the Apes. In an example of semiotics, the judges mimic the "see no evil, hear no evil, speak no evil" monkeys.

In a spoof of this saying, Bob Dole quipped about a meeting of former US Presidents: "Carter, Ford and Nixon: see no evil, hear no evil and evil."

The maxim inspired an award-winning 2008 Turkish film by director Nuri Bilge Ceylan called Three Monkeys (Üç Maymun).

A depiction of the Three Wise Monkeys can be seen carved into a faux tree behind the service counter at Bengal Barbecue in Disneyland's Adventureland across from Indiana Jones Adventure.

In the Walt Disney Animation Studios film Encanto (2021), the gifts that the protagonist's three cousins are given have this theme. See, Hear, and Speak are used with Dolores who has the gift of super-hearing, Camilo who has the gift of shapeshifting, making it so he can change how people see him, and Antonio who has the gift of speaking to animals.

Unicode characters
Unicode provides emoji representations of the monkeys in the Emoticons block as follows:
 Mizaru: 
 Kikazaru: 
 Iwazaru:

See also

 Buddhist Noble Eightfold Path: Right speech and right action
 Humata, Hukhta, Hvarshta, "good thoughts, good words, good deeds" in Zoroastrianism
 Lashon hara, prohibition of gossip in Judaism
 Manasa, vacha, karmana, three Sanskrit words referring to mind, speech and actions
 Plausible deniability, being able to convincingly claim ignorance of something incriminating
 Trikaya, a formulation in Buddhism referring to body, speech and mind
 Willful blindness, knowingly refraining from pursuing available information or knowingly sheltering oneself from information

Notes

References
 
 Archer Taylor, “Audi, Vidi, Tace” and the three monkeys
 A. W. Smith, Folklore, Vol. 104, No. ½ pp. 144–150 "On the Ambiguity of the Three Wise Monkeys"

External links

 Collector's picture gallery
 Information compiled by collectors
 Monkey(saru)-Kōshin on onmarkproductions.com
 More Information compiled by Collectors

Buddhist folklore
Japanese folklore
Metaphors referring to monkeys
Trios
Animals in Buddhism
Mammals in religion
Mahatma Gandhi
Gandhism
Good and evil
Mythological monkeys